Bari Karol Wojtyła Airport  is an airport serving the city of Bari in Italy. Named after Pope John Paul II, who was born Karol Wojtyła, the airport is also known as Palese Airport after a nearby neighbourhood. The airport handled  3,289,239 passengers in 2021.

History

Early years

The airport of Bari was originally a military airfield, built in the 1930s, by the Regia Aeronautica. During World War II Italian Campaign, it was seized by the British Eighth Army in late September 1943, and turned into an Allied military airfield. Until the end of the war in May 1945, it was used by the Royal Air Force and the United States Army Air Forces Twelfth and Fifteenth Air Forces both as an operational airfield as well as a command and control base. In addition, the airfield was used by the Italian Co-Belligerent Air Force (Aviazione Cobelligerante Italiana, or ACI), or Air Force of the South (Aeronautica del Sud), and the Balkan Air Force. After the war, it was turned over to the postwar Air Force of the Italian Republic (Aeronautica Militare Italiana).

In the 1960s, it was opened to civil flights and Alitalia schedules regular flights to Rome, Catania, Palermo, Ancona, Venice. The routes were later taken over by ATI, using a Fokker F27 airplane. When ATI put into operation the new DC-9-30 it became necessary to create a new runway, while the military complex was still used as passenger terminal.

In 1981, a new building was completed, originally intended to be used as a cargo terminal, but it became in fact the airport's new passenger terminal.

Development since the 1990s
In 1990, with the 1990 FIFA World Cup, the runway was extended and the terminal was upgraded, going through a further renovation in 2000. However, the traffic increase showed the infrastructural limitations of the airport and in 2002 the founding stone of the new passenger terminal was laid out. At the same time, flight infrastructures (aircraft parking areas, runway etc.) were upgraded. In 2005, the new terminal was completed and opened to passengers.

In 2005, construction works for a new control tower began and they were completed the following year. In 2006, a further extension of the runway was begun, and in 2007, the planning of an extension of the passenger terminals was commissioned. They were upgraded in 2005–2006 with the opening of a new passenger terminal equipped with 4 jet bridges and a multistorey car park.

Airlines and destinations

The following airlines operate regular scheduled, seasonal, and charter flights to and from Bari:

Statistics

Ground transportation

Road
The airport can be reached by the ring road of Bari and from the A14 motorway.

Rail

The Bari metropolitan railway service connects the Airport with the Bari Centrale railway station in the city centre.

Bus
AMTAB buses provide public transportation to the airport from the city centre (Line 16).
Pugliairbus is a seasonal bus transportation service which operates interconnection service with Brindisi and Foggia airports. Pugliairbus also reaches touristic locations.

Accidents and incidents
Sixteen of the thirty-nine people on board died. The accident resulted from engine fuel starvation. During maintenance the fuel quantity indicator (FQI) was changed using an FQI for an ATR 42 instead of an ATR 72.

See also
Kraków John Paul II International Airport
João Paulo II Airport Ponta Delgada (Azores)
List of airports in Italy

References

External links

 
 

Airports in Apulia
Airport, International
Buildings and structures in the Province of Bari
Pope John Paul II
Italian airbases